Shallot may refer to:
Shallot, a widely cultivated plant producing an edible bulb 
Persian shallot, a  plant native to Central Asia with edible bulbs sometimes gathered in the wild
Part of the sound producing mechanism in a reed pipe of a pipe organ

Shallot may be a misspelling of:
Shalott, an island in the poem "The Lady of Shalott" by Alfred Tennyson